Friary Halt railway station served an area south of Rossnowlagh in County Donegal, Ireland.

The station opened on 1 March 1953 on the Donegal Railway Company line from Donegal to Ballyshannon.

It closed on 1 January 1960.

Routes

References

Disused railway stations in County Donegal
Railway stations opened in 1953
Railway stations closed in 1960